The PSD Bank Arena (formerly known as Stadion am Bornheimer Hang) is a multi-use stadium in  Bornheim, a district of Frankfurt am Main, Germany, and is best accessed by the Johanna-Tesch-Platz U-Bahn station, or (for away fans) the Eissporthalle/Festplatz station.  It is currently used mostly for football matches and is the home stadium of FSV Frankfurt and occasionally used to host 1. FFC Frankfurt (now Eintracht Frankfurt).  It has a capacity of 12.542.

The inaugurational game was played on 11 October 1931, when FSV Frankfurt defeated VfL Germania 1894, 3–0.

Since 2015 the stadium is also used by the Frankfurt Universe, an American football team playing in the German Football League.

The stadium was host to the Kosovo national football team's first fully recognised international; a 2–0 win over the Faroe Islands on 3 June 2016.

Beginning with the inaugural season of the new European League of Football, the Frankfurt Galaxy played all their home games at the stadium.

References

External links 

 Stadium on Website of FSV Frankfurt
 picture gallery at Stadionwelt

Football venues in Germany
Athletics (track and field) venues in Germany
FSV Frankfurt
Buildings and structures in Frankfurt
Football venues in Frankfurt
American football venues in Germany
1931 establishments in Germany
Sports venues completed in 1931
Frankfurt Galaxy (ELF)
European League of Football venues